Sengkang is a town in Tangkak District, Johor, Malaysia. The local authority of town is Ledang Municipal Council.

References

Tangkak District